C-RAN (Cloud-RAN), also referred to as Centralized-RAN, is an architecture for cellular networks. C-RAN is a centralized, cloud computing-based architecture for radio access networks that supports 2G, 3G, 4G and future wireless communication standards. Its name comes from the four 'C's in the main characteristics of C-RAN system, "Clean, Centralized processing, Collaborative radio, and a real-time Cloud Radio Access Network".

Background
Traditional cellular, or Radio Access Networks (RAN), consist of many stand-alone base stations (BTS). Each BTS covers a small area, whereas a group BTS provides coverage over a continuous area. Each BTS processes and transmits its own signal to and from the mobile terminal, and forwards the data payload to and from the mobile terminal and out to the core network via the backhaul. Each BTS has its own cooling, back haul transportation, backup battery, monitoring system, and so on. Because of limited spectral resources, network operators 'reuse' the frequency among different base stations, which can cause interference between neighboring cells.

There are several limitations in the traditional cellular architecture. First, each BTS is costly to build and operate. Moore's law helps reduce the size and power of an electrical system, but the supporting facilities of the BTS are not improved quite as well. Second, when more BTS are added to a system to improve its capacity, interference among BTS is more severe as BTS are closer to each other and more of them are using the same frequency. Third, because users are mobile, the traffic of each BTS fluctuates (called 'tide effect'), and as a result, the average utilization rate of individual BTS is pretty low. However, these processing resources cannot be shared with other BTS. Therefore, all BTS are designed to handle the maximum traffic, not average traffic, resulting in a waste of processing resources and power at idle times.

Evolution of base station architecture

All-in-one macro base station

In the 1G and 2G cellular networks, base stations had an all-in-one architecture. Analog, digital, and power functions were housed in a single cabinet as large as a refrigerator. Usually the base station cabinet was placed in a dedicated room along with all necessary supporting facilitates such as power, backup battery, air conditioning, environment surveillance, and backhaul transmission equipment. The RF signal is generated by the base station RF unit and propagates through pairs of RF cables up to the antennas on the top of a base station tower or other mounting points. This all-in-one architecture was mostly found in macro cell deployments.

Distributed base station

For 3G, a distributed base station architecture was introduced by Ericsson, Nokia, Huawei, and other leading telecom equipment vendors. In this architecture the radio function unit, also known as the remote radio head (RRH), is separated from the digital function unit, or baseband unit (BBU) by fiber. Digital baseband signals are carried over fiber, using the Open Base Station Architecture Initiative (OBSAI) or Common Public Radio Interface (CPRI) standard. The RRH can be installed on the top of tower close to the antenna, reducing the loss compared to the traditional base station where the RF signal has to travel through a long cable from the base station cabinet to the antenna at the top of the tower. The fiber link between RRH and BBU also allows more flexibility in network planning and deployment as they can be placed a few hundred meters or a few kilometers away. Most modern base stations now use this decoupled architecture.

C-RAN/Cloud-RAN

C-RAN may be viewed as an architectural evolution of the above distributed base station system. It takes advantage of many technological advances in wireless, optical and IT communications systems. For example, it uses the latest CPRI standard, low cost Coarse or Dense Wavelength Division Multiplexing (CWDM/ DWDM) technology, and mmWave to allow transmission of baseband signal over long distance thus achieving large scale centralised base station deployment. It applies recent Data Centre Network technology to allow a low cost, high reliability, low latency and high bandwidth interconnect network in the BBU pool. It utilizes open platforms and real-time virtualization technology rooted in cloud computing to achieve dynamic shared resource allocation and support multi-vendor, multi-technology environments.

Architecture overview
C-RAN architecture has the following characteristics that are distinct from other cellular architectures:

 Large scale centralized deployment: Allows many RRHs to connect to a centralized BBU pool. The maximum distance can be 20km in fiber link for 4G (LTE/LTE-A) systems, and even longer distances (40km~80km) for 3G (WCDMA/TD-SCDMA) and 2G (GSM/CDMA) systems.
 Native support to Collaborative Radio technologies: Any BBU can talk with any other BBU within the BBU pool with very high bandwidth (10Gbit/s and above) and low latency (10us level). This is enabled by the interconnection of BBUs in the pool. This is one major difference from BBU Hotelling, or base station Hotelling; in the latter case, the BBUs of different base stations are simply stacked together and have no direct link between them to allow physical layer co-ordination.
 Real-time virtualization capability based on open platform: This is different from traditional base stations built on proprietary hardware, where the software and hardware are close-sourced and provided by single vendors. In contrast, a C-RAN BBU pool is built on open hardware, like x86/ARM CPU based servers, and interface cards that handle fiber links to RRHs and inter-connections in the pool. Real-time virtualization ensures that resources in the pool can be allocated dynamically to base station software stacks, say 4G/3G/2G function modules from different vendors, according to network load. However, to satisfy the strict timing requirements of wireless communication systems, the real-time performance for C-RAN is at the level of 10s of microseconds, which is two orders of magnitude better than the millisecond level 'real-time' performance usually seen in Cloud Computing environments.

Similar architecture and systems
KT, a telecom operator in the Republic of Korea, introduced a Cloud Computing Center (CCC) system in their 3G (WCDMA/HSPA) and 4G (LTE/LTE-A) network in 2011 and 2012. The concept of CCC is basically the same as C-RAN.

SK Telecom has also deployed Smart Cloud Access Network (SCAN) and Advanced-SCAN in their 4G (LTE/LTE-A) network in Korea no later than 2012.

In 2014, Airvana (now CommScope) introduced OneCell, a C-RAN-based small cell system designed for enterprises and public spaces.

Competing architectures in cellular network evolution

All-in-one BTS

One major alternative solution that is addressing similar challenges of RAN, is the small size, all-in-one outdoor BTS. Thanks to the achievements in the semiconductor industry, all the functionality of a BTS, including RF, baseband processing, MAC processing and package level processing, can now be implemented in a volume of <50 liters. This makes the system small and weatherproof, reduces the difficulty of BTS site choice and construction, eliminates the air conditioning requirement, and thus reduces operational costs.

However, because each BTS is still working on its own, it cannot readily make use of the collaboration algorithms to reduce the interference between neighboring BTSs. It is also relatively hard to upgrade or repair because the all-in-one BTS units are usually mounted near the antenna. More processing units in less-protected environments also implies a higher failure rate compared to C-RAN, which only has the RRU deployed outdoors.

The advantage of Cloud RAN lies in its ability to implement LTE-Advanced features such as Coordinated MultiPoint (CoMP) with very low latency between multiple radio heads. However, the economic benefit of improvements such as CoMP can be negated by the higher backhaul costs for some operators.

Small cell

The main competition between small cell and C-RAN occurs in two deployment scenarios: outdoor hotspot coverage and indoor coverage.

Academic research and publications
As one of the promising evolution paths for future cellular network architecture, C-RAN has attracted high academic research interest. Meanwhile, because the native support of cooperative radio capability built into the C-RAN architecture, it also enables many advanced algorithms that were hard to implement in cellular networks, including Cooperative Multi-Point Transmission/Receiving, Network Coding, etc.

In October 2011, Wireless World Research Forum 27 was hosted in Germany, when China Mobile was invited to give a C-RAN presentation.

In August 2012, IEEE C-RAN 2012 workshop was hosted in Kunming, China.

CRC Press published a book, "Green Communications: Theoretical Fundamentals, Algorithms and Applications", and has as its 11th chapter: "C-RAN: A Green RAN Framework".

In December 2012, an IEEE GlobalCom 2012 conference, International Workshop on Cloud Based-Stations and Large-Scale Cooperative Communications,  was hosted in California, USA.

The European Committee Frame Project 7 has sponsors and is currently addressing many problems related to cellular network architecture evolution. Many of these projects have taken C-RAN as one of the future cellular network architectures, like the Mobile Cloud Network project.

References

External links
Official C-RAN website in China Mobile Research Institute
the first C-RAN international workshop website, in Chinese
ASOCS Asserts that C-RAN is a Superior Implementation
ASOCS & ARM announce cloud-ran reference-design
asocs and Windriver(INTC) popularize virtual Base Stations 
CommScope Definitions: What-is-C-RAN?
Cell Virtualization with C-RAN Small Cells

Radio technology
Cloud computing